A list of  titles. Series that have been licensed for U.S. publication (in part or in full) are in bold.

See also

 List of light novel labels
List of best-selling light novels
 List of video games based on anime or manga
 List of manga
 List of manga magazines
 Dōjin
 Wikipedia:Requested articles/Japan

 

ru:Лайт-новел#Примеры «лайт-новел»